Bobby La Gesse is a sportswriter and editor, currently working for the Ames Tribune in Ames, Iowa.  He covers primarily Iowa State Cyclones sports  and has been viewed as an authority on the programs by ESPN, Sports Business Daily, The Oklahoman, and NBC Sports.

References

External links
 The Blind Side Blitz Bobby La Gesse's official blog at the Ames Tribune (photo)

American sports journalists
Writers from Iowa